Education in Iran is centralized and divided into K-12 education plus higher education. Elementary and secondary education is supervised by the Ministry of Education and higher education is under supervision of Ministry of Science, Research and Technology and Ministry of Health and Medical Education (medical fields). As of 2016, 86% of the Iranian adult population are literate. This rate increases to 97% among young adults (aged between 15 and 24) without any gender discrepancy. By 2007, Iran had a student to workforce population ratio of 10.2%, standing among the countries with highest ratio in the world.

Primary school (Dabestân, دبستان) starts at the age of 6 for a duration of six years. Junior high school (Dabirestân دوره اول دبیرستان), also known as middle school, includes three years of Dabirestân from the seventh to the ninth grade. Senior high school (Dabirestân, دوره دوم دبیرستان), including the last three years, is not mandatory. The student at this level can choose to study is theoretical, vocational/technical or manual fields, each program with its own specialties and in the end of it, students are given a high school diploma. The requirement to enter into higher education is to have a high school diploma, and passing the national university entrance examination, Iranian University Entrance Exam (Konkur کنکور), which is similar to the French baccalauréat exam (for most of universities and fields of study).

Universities, institutes of technology, medical schools and community colleges, provide the higher education. Higher education is sanctioned by different levels of diplomas: Fogh-e-Diplom or Kārdāni after two years of higher education, Kārshenāsi (also known under the name "licence") is delivered after four years of higher education (bachelor's degree). Kārshenāsi-ye Arshad is delivered after two more years of study (master's degree). After which, another exam allows the candidate to pursue a doctoral program (PhD).

The Human Rights Measurement Initiative (HRMI) finds that Iran is fulfilling only 91.0% of what it should be fulfilling for the right to education based on the country's level of income. HRMI breaks down the right to education by looking at the rights to both primary education and secondary education. While taking into consideration Iran's income level, the nation is achieving 99.2% of what should be possible based on its resources (income) for primary education but only 82.9% for secondary education.

History of education in Iran

Pre-Islamic Iran 
Scholars have discovered documents from around 550 BC relating to an emphasis on education in ancient Persia (modern day Iran). The documents urged people to gain knowledge to better understand God and to live a life of prosperity. Religious schools were set up in limited areas to serve the government. Although the majority of the problems focused on religious studies, there were also lessons regarding administration, politics, technical skills, military, sports, and arts. The first higher education organization, Gundeshapur or Jondishapoor (which still exists) was formed during the Sassanid period, around the third century.

Safavid dynasty 
This dynasty marks the first of modern education in Iran. There was a mixed emphasis on Islamic values and scientific advancements.

Muzaffari era 
Formed in 1898, the Educational Committee (Anjuman-i Ma'arf) was the first organized program to promote educational reform not funded by the state. The committee was composed of members of foreign services, ulama, wealthy merchants, physicians, and other prominent people. The conflicting interests of people involved led to difficulties enacting, however they did succeed in the opening of many new primary and secondary educational schools. It also created a public library, offered adult classes, published an official newspaper (Ruznamah-i Ma'arif), and established a printing company called The Book Printing Company (Shirkat-i Tab'-i Kitab).

The Literacy Corps (1969–1979) 
The literacy corps took place over the White Revolution, which occurred under Muhammad Reza Pahlavi. It was believed by the government that the majority of the population was illiterate, and the Literacy Corps was an attempt to change the statistics. The program included hiring young men who had a degree in secondary education to serve in the Literacy Corps and involved teaching children between the ages of 6 and 12, most of whom had not attended 2nd grade education, to read. The goal was to improve literacy in Iran in a cheap and efficient manner, which they also believed would improve workmanship. 200,000 young men and woman participated in the Literacy Corps, teaching 2.2 million boys and girls and over a million adults. In many cases, the volunteers would continue to work as educators after their conscription ended.

Post-Islamic Revolution 
At first, post-1979 Islamic Revolution placed heavy emphasis on educational reforms. Politicians wanted Islamic values to be present within the schooling system as quickly as possible. However, pressures due to the Iran-Iraq War and economic disparities forced plans for education back as other issues took priority. However, some significant changes were made. First came the Islamization of textbooks. Schools were then segregated according to the sex of students. Observation of Islamic Law in schools became mandatory and religious ceremonies were maintained.

By the 1990s, more significant changes arose. The annual academic system switched to a system based on credits. For example, if a student were to fail a class, rather than repeating the whole year they would simply retake the credits. The mandatory duration of high school was shortened from four years to three, however the fourth year was still available as an option to bridge the gap between high school and university. Also, many technical and vocational programs were added to help train students for the workforce, which proved to be popular with students.

Modern education

The first Western-style public schools were established by Haji-Mirza Hassan Roshdieh. Amir Kabir (the Grand Minister) helped the first modern Iranian college establish in the mid-nineteenth century, and the first Iranian university modeled after European universities was established during the first Pahlavi period. There are both free public schools and private schools in Iran at all levels, from elementary school through university. Education in Iran is highly centralized. The Ministry of Education is in charge of educational planning, financing, administration, curriculum, and textbook development. Teacher training, grading, and examinations are also the responsibility of the ministry. At the university level, however, every student attending public schools is required to commit to serve the government for a number of years typically equivalent to those spent at the university, or pay it off for a very low price (typically a few hundred dollars) or completely free if one can prove inability to pay to the Islamic government (post-secondary and university). During the early 1970s, efforts were made to improve the educational system by updating the school curriculum, introducing modern textbooks, and training more efficient teachers.

The 1979 revolution continued the country's emphasis on education with the new government putting its own stamp on the process. The most important change was the Islamization of the education system. All students were segregated by sex. In 1980, the Cultural Revolution Committee was formed to oversee the institution of Islamic values in education. An arm of the committee, the Center for Textbooks (composed mainly of clerics), produced 3,000 new college-level textbooks reflecting Islamic views by 1983. Teaching materials based on Islam were introduced into the primary grades within six months of the revolution.

Grades

Budget

Each year, 20% of government spending and 5% of GDP goes to education, a higher rate than most other developing countries. 50% of education spending is devoted to secondary education and 21% of the annual state education budget is devoted to the provision of tertiary education.

Education reform

The Fourth Five-Year Development Plan (2005–2010) has envisaged upgrading the quality of the educational system at all levels, as well as reforming education curricula, and developing appropriate programs of vocational training, a continuation of the trend towards labor market-oriented education and training.

With the new education reform plan in 2012, the pre-university year will be replaced with an additional year in elementary school. Students will have the same teacher for the first 3 years of primary school. Emphasis will be made on research, knowledge production and questioning instead of math and memorizing alone. In the new system the teacher will no longer be the only instructor but a facilitator and guide.

Other more general goals of the education reform are:
Making the education more global in terms of knowledge.
Nurturing children who believe in the one God.
Providing a socially just education system.
Increasing the role of the family in the education system.
Increasing the efficiency of the education system.
Achieving the highest standard of education in the region.

Teacher education
Farhangian University is the university of teacher education and human resource development in Ministry of Education. Teacher training centers in iran are responsible for training teachers for primary, orientation cycle, and gifted children's schools. These centers offer four-year programs leading to a BA or BS degree in teaching the relevant subject. Students that enter teacher training centers, have at minimum, completed a high school diploma. A national entrance examination is required for admission.

There are 98 teacher training centers in Iran, all belonging to Farhangian University. Teacher education in Iran has been considered more centralized than other Western countries such as Great Britain.

Foreign languages

Persian is officially the national language of Iran. Arabic, as the language of the Koran, is taught grades 7–12. In addition to Arabic, students are required to take one foreign language class in grades 7–12. Although German and French are offered in some schools and textbooks have been written, English continues to be the most desired language. Iran has added the French language since 2022 new school year to regular school curriculum for students who wish to take French instead of English in an effort to break the monopoly of English.

Kanoun-e-Zabaan-e-Iran or Iran's Language Institute affiliated to Center for Intellectual Development of Children and Young Adults was founded in 1979. Persian, English, French, Spanish, German, Russian and Arabic are taught to over 175,000 students during each term.

English is studied in first and second high school. However, the quality of English education in schools is not satisfactory, and most students have to take English courses in private institutes to obtain a better English fluency and proficiency.

Before 2018, some primary schools also taught English. However, in January 2018, a senior educational official announced that teaching English would be banned in primary schools, including non-government primary schools.

Presently, there are over 5000 foreign language schools in the country, 200 of which are situated in Tehran. A few television channels air weekly English and Arabic language sessions, particularly for university candidates who are preparing for the annual entrance test.

Internet and distance education

Full Internet service is available in all major cities and it is very rapidly increasing. Many small towns and even some villages now have full Internet access. The government aims to provide 10% of government and commercial services via the Internet by end-2008 and to equip every school with computers and connections by the same date.

Payame Noor University (established 1987) as a provider exclusively of distance education courses is a state university under the supervision of the Ministry of Science, Research and Technology.

As of 2020, 70% of Iranian schools linked to the local intranet.

Higher education

As of 2013, 4.5 million students are enrolled in universities, out of a total population of 75 million.</ref> Iranian universities graduate almost 750,000 annually.

The tradition of university education in Iran goes back to the ancient times. By the twentieth century, however, the system had become antiquated and was remodeled along French lines. The country's 16 universities were closed after the 1979 revolution and were then reopened gradually between 1982 and 1983 under Islamic supervision.

While the universities were closed, the Cultural Revolution Committee investigated professors and teachers and dismissed those who were believers in Marxism, liberalism, and other "imperialistic" ideologies. The universities reopened with Islamic curricula. In 1997, all higher-level institutions had 40,477 teachers and enrolled 579,070 students.

Admission to public universities, some are tuition-free, is based solely on performance on the nationwide Konkour exam. Some alternative to the public universities is the Islamic Azad University which charges high fees.

The syllabus of all the universities in Iran is decided by a national council as a result the difference of the quality of education among the universities is only based on the location and the quality of the students and the faculty members. Among all top universities in the country there are three universities each notable for some reasons:

The University of Tehran (founded in 1934) has 10 faculties, including a department of Islamic theology. It is the oldest (in the modern system) and biggest university in Iran. It has been the birthplace of several social and political movements.

Tarbiat Modares University (means: professor training university) also located in Tehran is the only exclusively post-graduate institute in Iran. It only offers master's, PhD, and postdoc programs. It is also the most comprehensive Iranian university in the sense that it is the only university under the Iranian Ministry of Science System that has a Medical School. All other Medical Schools in Iran are a separate university and governed under the Ministry of Health; for example, the Tehran University of Medical Sciences (commonly known as Medical School of Tehran University) is in fact separate from Tehran University.

Sharif University of Technology, Amirkabir University of Technology, and Iran University of Science and Technology also located in Tehran are nationally well known for taking in the top undergraduate engineering and science students; and internationally recognized for training competent undergraduate students. It has probably the highest percentage of graduates who seek higher education abroad.

K. N. Toosi University of Technology is among most prestigious universities in Tehran. Other major universities are at Shiraz, Tabriz, Isfahan, Mashhad, Ahvaz, Kerman, Kermanshah, Babolsar, Rasht, and Orumiyeh. There are about 50 colleges and 40 technological institutes.

In 2009, 33.7% of all those in the 18–25 age group were enrolled in one of the 92 universities, 512 Payame Noor University branches, and 56 research and technology institutes around the country. There are currently some 3.0 million university students in Iran and 1.0 million study at the 500 branches of Islamic Azad University. Iran had 1 million medical students in 2011.

Entrepreneurship

In recent decades Iran has shown an increasing interest in various entrepreneurship fields, in higher educational settings, policy making and business. Although primary and secondary school textbooks do not address entrepreneurship, several universities including Tehran University and Sharif University, offer courses on entrepreneurship to undergraduate and graduate students.

In accordance with the third five-year development plan, the "entrepreneurship development plan in Iranian universities", (known as KARAD Plan) was developed, and launched in twelve universities across the country, under the supervision of Management and Planning Organization and the Ministry of Science, Research and Technology.

Women in education

In September 2012, women made up more than 60% of all universities' student body in Iran. This high level of achievement and involvement in high education is a recent development of the past decades. The right to a respectable education has been a major demand of the Iranian women's movement starting in the early twentieth century.

Before the 1979 revolution a limited number of women went to male-dominated schools and most traditional families did not send their girls to school because the teachers were men or the school was not Islamic. During the 1990s, women's enrollment in educational institutions began to increase. The establishment and the expansion of private universities Daneshgah-e-azad-e Islami also contributed to the increasing enrollment for both women and men. Under the presidency of Rafsanjani and the High council of cultural Revolution, the Women's social and cultural council was set up and charged with studying the legal, social, and economic problems of women. The council, with the support of Islamic feminists worked to lift all restrictions on women entering any fields of study in 1993.

After the Islamic Revolution, Ayatollah Ruhollah Khomeini and his new regime prioritized the Islamization of the Iranian education system for both women and men. When Khomeini died in 1989, under president Akbar Hashemi Rafsanjani, many but not all restrictions on women's education were lifted, albeit with controversy. The right to education for everyone without discrimination is explicitly guaranteed under Iran's constitution and international documents, which Iran has accepted or to which it is a party. Some scholars believe that women have poor access to higher education because of certain policies and the oppression of women's right in Iran's strictly Islamic society.

However, Iranian women do have fair access to higher education as seen by a significant increase in female enrollment and graduation rates as women university students now outnumber males. Iranian women emerge to more prominent positions in the labor force, and demonstrate the presence and confidence of professional women in the public sphere. The opportunities for women's education and their involvement in higher education has grown exponentially after the Iranian Revolution. According to UNESCO world survey, Iran has the highest female to male ratio at primary level of enrollment in the world among sovereign nations, with a girl to boy ratio of 1.22:1.

Schools for Gifted Children
The National Organization for Development of Exceptional Talents (NODET), also known as SAMPAD (سمپاد), maintains middle and high schools in Iran. These schools were shut down for a few years after the revolution, but later re-opened. Admittance is based on an entrance examination and is very competitive. Their tuition is similar to private schools but may be partially or fully waived depending on the students' financial condition.
Some NODET alumni are world-leading scientists.
Other schools are Selective Schools which are called "Nemoone Dolati". These schools are controlled by the government and have no fees. Students take this entrance exam alongside NODET exams.

Organization for Educational Research and Planning (OERP)

OERP is a government affiliated, scientific, learning organization. It has qualitative and knowledge-based curricula consistent with the scientific and research findings, technological, national identity, Islamic and cultural values.

OERP's Responsibilities:

1. To research on the content of the educational,
2. To study and develop simple methods for examinations and educational assessments,
3. To write, edit and print text-books,
4. To identify and provide educational tools and the list of standards for educational tools and equipments,
5. To run pure research on improving the quality and quantity of education,
6. To perform other responsibilities issued by the OERP Council.

Prominent high schools in Iran: historical and current

Aboureihan High School
Alborz High School
Allameh Helli High Schools (NODET)
Allameh Tabatabaei High School
Bagherol Oloom High School
Daneshmand High School
Danesh High School
Energy Atomi High School
Farzanegan High Schools (NODET)
Firouz Bahram High School
Hadaf No.3 High School
Imam Ali High School (NODET)
Imam Mousa Sadr High School
Kamal High school
Mirza Koochak Khan High School (NODET)
Mofid No.1 and No.2 High School
Nikan High School
Rahyar Educational Complex
Razi High School
Roshangaran High school
Salam High Schools
Shahid Beheshti High School, Soheil
Shahid Dastgheib High School(NODET)
Shahid Ejei High School (NODET)
Shahid Soltani School (NODET)
Shahid Saleh school (examplery school)

International Baccalaureate schools 
Iran has three International Baccalaureate (IB) schools. They are Mehr-e-Taban International School, Shahid Mahdavi International School, and Tehran International School.

Mehr-e-Taban International School is an authorized IB world school in Shiraz offering the Primary Years Programme, Middle Years Programme and Diploma Programme. Shahid Mahdavi School is an IB world school in Tehran offering the Primary Years Programme and Middle Years Programme. Tehran International School is an IB world school in Tehran offering the Diploma Programme.

Statistics

 Iran produces the third highest number of engineers in the world. Around 70% of engineering graduates are women.
 As of 2016 Iran has the 5th highest number of STEM graduates worldwide with 335,000 annual graduates.
In 2010, 64% of the country's population was under the age of 30.
There are approximately 92,500 public educational institutions at all levels, with a total enrollment of approximately 17,488,000 students.
 According to 2008 estimates, 89.3% of males and 80.7% of females over the age of 15 are literate; thus 85% of the population is literate. Virtually all children of the relevant age group enrolled into primary schools in 2008 while enrollment into secondary schools increased from 66% in 1995 to 80% in 2008. As a result, youth literacy rates increased from 86% to 94% over the same period, rising significantly for girls.
 A literacy corps was established in 1963 to send educated conscripts to villages. During its first 10 years, the corps helped 2.2 million urban children and 600,000 adults become literate. This corps was replaced with the Literacy Movement Organization after the Islamic Revolution.
 In 1997, there were 9,238,393 pupils enrolled in 63,101 primary schools, with 298,755 teachers. The student-to-teacher ratio stood at 31 to 1. In that same year, secondary schools had 8,776,792 students and 280,309 teachers. The pupil-teacher ratio at the primary level was 26 to 1 in 1999. In the same year, 83% of primary-school-age children were enrolled in school. As of 1999, public expenditure on education was estimated at 4.6% of GDP (not budget).
 In 2007, the majority of students (60%) enrolled in Iranian universities were women.
 According to UNESCO world survey, Iran has the highest female to male ratio at primary level of enrollment in the world among sovereign nations, with a girl to boy ratio of 1.22 : 1.00.
 Each year, 20% of government spending and 5% of GDP goes to education, a higher rate than most other developing countries. 50% of education spending is devoted to secondary education and 21% of the annual state education budget is devoted to the provision of tertiary education.

See also

 International Rankings of Iran in Education
 List of Iranian Research Centers
 Darolfonoon
 Modern Iranian scientists, scholars, and engineers
 Economy of Iran
 Hassan Roshdieh
 Iranian people
 Nodet
 Media in Iran
 Science and technology in Iran
 Social class in Iran
 Sport in Iran

Notes

Further reading
 Passow, A. Harry et al. The National Case Study: An Empirical Comparative Study of Twenty-One Educational Systems. (1976) online

External links

Ministry of Education Of Iran Official Website
Ministry of Health and Medical Education – Iran
Education, Encyclopedia Iranica
Annual Reviews – Reports by the Central Bank of Iran, including statistics about education in Iran.

World Education Services – Iran's entry
Statistical center of Iran
OERP's official website

Specialized reports
Iran, the UNESCO EFA 2000 Assessment: Country Reports

 
Economy of Iran